This is a list of programs broadcast on South Korean terrestrial television channel MBC TV.

Television series

MBC primetime flagship dramas are broadcast at 21:55 until the scheduling changes in April 2019, which broadcast was changed to 20:55, with each series airing on two consecutive nights: Mondays and Tuesdays, Wednesdays and Thursdays, and Saturdays.

Monday–Tuesday
For further details see Korean-language Wikipedia article: 문화방송 월화드라마.

Monday–Tuesday (20:55)

 Welcome 2 Life (웰컴2라이프; 2019)
 365: Repeat the Year (365: 운명을 거스르는 1년; 2020)
 Dinner Mate (저녁 같이 드실래요?; 2020)
 Find Me in Your Memory (그 남자의 기억법; 2020)

Monday–Tuesday (21:20)
  (연애는 귀찮지만 외로운 건 싫어!; 2020)
 Kairos (카이로스; 2020)

Monday–Tuesday (21:55)

  (백년손님; 1980)
  (장희빈; 1981–1982)
  (남강 이승훈; 1982)
  (공주갑부 김갑순; 1982)
  (백산 안희제; 1982)
  (이용익; 1982)
  (무역왕 최봉준; 1983)
  (야망의 25시; 1983)
  (내일은 태양; 1983)
  (뿌리깊은 나무; 1983)
  (설중매; 1984)
  (풍란; 1985)
  (임진왜란; 1985)
  (회천문; 1986)
  (남한산성; 1986)
  (불새; 1987)
  (야호; 1987)
  (부초; 1987)
  (내일 또 내일; 1987)
  (최후의 증인; 1987)
  (산하; 1987)
  (아름다운 밀회; 1987)
  (갈 수 없는 나라; 1987)
  (퇴역전선; 1987)
  (유혹; 1987)
  (인생화보; 1987)
  (딸아; 1987)
  (선생님 우리 선생님; 1988)
  (원미동 사람들; 1988)
  (그것은 우리도 모른다; 1988)
  (거리의 악사; 1988)
  (인간시장; 1988)
  (내일이 오면; 1988)
  (마지막 우상; 1988)
  (대검자; 1988)
  (모래성; 1988)
  (우리 읍내; 1988)
  (도시의 흉년; 1988)
  (겨울 안개; 1989)
  (철새; 1989)
  (황제를 위하여; 1989)
  (잠들지 않는 나무; 1989)
  (나비야 청산가자; 1989)
  (상처; 1989)
  (제5열; 1989)
  (대도전; 1989)
  (천사의 선택; 1989)
  (완장; 1989)
  (거인; 1989)
  (마당 깊은 집; 1990)
  (여자는 무엇으로 사는가; 1990)
  (완전한 사랑; 1990)
  (똠방각하; 1990)
  (어둔 하늘 어둔 새; 1990)
  (춤추는 가얏고; 1990)
  (재미있는 세상; 1990)
  (겨울 이야기; 1991)
  (고궁; 1991)
  (이별의 시작; 1991)
  (장미빛 인생; 1991)
  (행복어사전; 1991)
  (내 마음은 호수; 1991)
  (동의보감; 1991)
  (약속; 1992)
  (행촌 아파트; 1992)
  (분노의 왕국; 1992)
  (질투; 1992)
  (4일 간의 사랑; 1992)
  (두 여자; 1992)
  (창밖에는 태양이 빛났다; 1992)
  (억새 바람; 1992)
  (걸어서 하늘까; 1993)
  (사랑의 방식; 1993)
  (산바람; 1993)
  (나는 천사가 아니다; 1993)
 Iljimae (일지매; 1993)
  (파일럿; 1993)
  (여자의 남자; 1993)
 The Last Match (마지막 승부; 1994)
  (맞수; 1994)
  (새야 새야 파랑새야; 1994)
  (아담의 도시; 1994)
  (사랑을 그대 품안에; 1994)
  (M; 1994)
  (도전; 1994)
  (마지막 연인; 1994)
  (거인의 손; 1994)
  (눈먼 새의 노래; 1994)
  (까레이스키; 1994)
  (호텔; 1995)
  (사랑을 기억하세요; 1995)
  (TV시티; 1995)
  (거미; 1995)
  (여; 1995)
  (연애의 기초; 1995)
  (별; 1996)
  (그들의 포옹; 1996)
  (1.5; 1996)
  (낫; 1996)
  (아이싱; 1996)
  (애인; 1996)
  (화려한 휴가; 1996)
  (세상에서 가장 아름다운 이별; 1996)
  (일곱개의 숟가락; 1996)
  (황금 깃털; 1997)
  (의가형제; 1997)
 Star in My Heart (별은 내가슴에; 1997)
  (불꽃; 1997)
  (청춘; 1999)
  (왕초; 1999)
  (마지막 전쟁; 1999)
  (국희; 1999)
 Hur Jun (허준; 1999–2000)
  ( 뜨거운 것이 좋아; 2000)
  (아줌마; 2000–2001)
  (홍국영; 2001)
  (선희진희; 2001)
  (상도; 2001–2002)
  (위기의 남자; 2002)
  (고백; 2002)
 My Love Patzzi (내 사랑 팥쥐; 2002)
  (어사 박문수; 2002–2003)
 Love Letter (러브레터; 2003)
  (내 인생의 콩깍지; 2003)
 Rooftop Room Cat (옥탑방 고양이; 2003)
 Damo (다모; 2003)
 Dae Jang Geum (대장금; 2003)
 Phoenix (불새; 2004)
  (영웅시대; 2004–2005)
 Wonderful Life (원더풀 라이프; 2005)
  (봄날의 미소; 2005)
  (환생-넥스트; 2005)
 Lawyers (변호사들; 2005)
 The Secret Lovers (비밀남녀; 2005)
 Sweet Spy (달콤한 스파이; 2005–2006)
  (늑대; 2006)
  (내 인생의 스페셜; 2006)
 Which Star Are You From (넌 어느 별에서 왔니; 2006)
 Jumong (주몽; 2007)
 H.I.T (히트; 2007)
  (신 현모양처; 2007)
 Coffee Prince (커피프린스 1호점; 2007)
 Legend of Hyang Dan (향단전; 2007)
 Yi San (이산; 2007–2008)
  (밤이면 밤마다; 2008)
 East of Eden (에덴의 동쪽; 2008–2009)
 Queen of Housewives (내조의 여왕; 2009)
 Queen Seondeok (선덕여왕; 2009)
 Pasta (파스타; 2010)
 Dong Yi (동이; 2010)
 Queen of Reversals (역전의 여왕; 2010)
 The Duo (짝패; 2011)
 Miss Ripley (굿바이 미스 리플리; 2011)
 Gyebaek (계백; 2011)
 Lights and Shadows (빛과 그림자; 2011–2012)
 Golden Time (골든타임; 2012)
 The King's Doctor (마의; 2012–2013)
 Gu Family Book (구가의서; 2013)
 Goddess of Fire (불의 여신 정이; 2013)
 Empress Ki (기황후; 2013–2014)
 Triangle (트라이앵글; 2014)
 The Night Watchman's Journal (야경꾼 일지; 2014)
 Pride and Prejudice (오만과 편견; 2014)
 Shine or Go Crazy (빛나거나 미치거나; 2015)
 Splendid Politics (화정; 2015)
 Glamorous Temptation (화려한 유혹; 2015–2016)
 Monster (몬스터; 2016)

Monday–Tuesday (22:00)

 Woman with a Suitcase (캐리어를 끄는 여자; 2016)
 Night Light (불야성; 2016–2017)
 The Rebel (역적: 백성을 훔친 도적; 2017)
 The Guardians (파수꾼; 2017)
 The King in Love (왕은 사랑한다; 2017)
 20th Century Boy and Girl (20세기 소년소녀; 2017)
 Two Cops (투깝스; 2017–2018)
 The Great Seducer (위대한 유혹자; 2018)
 You Drive Me Crazy (미치겠다, 너땜에; 2018)
 Partners for Justice (검법남녀; 2018)
 Risky Romance (사생결단 로맨스; 2018)
 Bad Papa (배드파파; 2018)
 Less Than Evil (나쁜 형사; 2018–2019)
 Item (아이템; 2019)
 Special Labor Inspector Jo (특별근로감독관 조장풍; 2019)
 Partners for Justice 2 (검법남녀 2; 2019)

Monday (22:50)
 Love Scene Number (러브씬넘버#; 2021)

Wednesday–Thursday
For further details see Korean-language Wikipedia article: 문화방송 수목 미니시리즈.

Wednesday–Thursday (20:55)
 One Spring Night (봄밤; 2019)
 The Game: Towards Zero (더 게임:0시를 향하여; 2020)
 Kkondae Intern (꼰대인턴; 2020)

Wednesday–Thursday (21:00)

 Secret (비밀; 2000)
 Rookie Historian Goo Hae-ryung (신입사관 구해령; 2019)
 Extraordinary You (어쩌다 발견한 하루; 2019)
 Love with Flaws (하자있는 인간들; 2019–2020)
 On the Verge of Insanity (미치지 않고서야; 2021)

Wednesday–Thursday (21:20)
 The Spies Who Loved Me (나를 사랑한 스파이; 2020)
 Here's My Plan (목표가 생겼다; 2021)

Wednesday–Thursday (21:30)

 She Knows Everything (미쓰리는 알고 있다; 2020)
  (십시일반; 2020)
 When I Was the Most Beautiful (내가 가장 예뻤을때; 2020)
 Oh! Master (오! 주인님; 2021)

Wednesday–Thursday (21:50)

 Eyes of Dawn (여명의 눈동자; 1991–1992)
 Goodbye My Love (안녕 내사랑; 1999)
 May I Help You (일당백집사; October 19 – December 22, 2022)

Wednesday–Thursday (21:55)

 Did We Really Love? (우리가 정말 사랑했을까; 1999)
  (햇빛속으로; 1999)
  (진실; 2000)
  (나쁜 친구들; 2000)
 All About Eve (이브의 모든 것; 2000)
 Mr. Duke (신귀공자; 2000)
 Delicious Proposal (맛있는 청혼; 2001)
 Hotelier (호텔리어; 2001)
 Four Sisters (네 자매 이야기; 2001)
  (반달곰 내사랑; 2001)
  (황금시대; 2000–2001)
  (가을에 만난 남자; 2001)
  (소풍; 2001)
  (그햇살이 나에게; 2002)
  (선물; 2002)
 Romance (로망스; 2002)
 Ruler of Your Own World (네 멋대로 해라; 2002) 
  (리멤버; 2002)
 Trio (삼총사; 2002–2003)
  (눈사람; 2003)
  (위풍당당 그녀; 2003)
  (남자의 향기; 2003)
  (앞집 여자; 2003)
  (좋은 사람; 2003)
  (나는 달린다; 2003)
  (사막의 샘; 2003)
  (아르곤; 2003)
  (천생연분; 2004)
  (사랑한다 말해줘; 2004)
  (결혼하고 싶은 여자; 2004)
 First Love of a Royal Prince (황태자의 첫사랑; 2004)
 Ireland (아일랜드; 2004)
  (12월의 열대야; 2004)
 Sad Love Story (슬픈연가; 2005)
 Super Rookie (신입사원; 2005)
 My Lovely Sam Soon (내 이름은 김삼순; 2005)
  (이별에 대처하는 우리의 자세; 2005)
 Autumn Shower (가을 소나기; 2005)
  (영재의 전성시대; 2005–2006)
 Princess Hours (궁; 2006)
 Dr. Kkang (닥터 깽; 2006)
 One Fine Day (어느 멋진 날; 2006)
 Over the Rainbow (오버 더 레인보우; 2006)
 What's Up Fox (여우야 뭐하니; 2006)
 90 Days, Time to Love (90일, 사랑할 시간; 2006–2007)
 Prince Hours (궁S; 2007)
 Thank You (고맙습니다; 2007)
 Merry Mary (메리대구 공방전; 2007)
  (그라운드 제로; 2007)
 Time Between Dog and Wolf (개와 늑대의 시간; 2007)
 The Legend (태왕사신기; 2007)
 New Heart (뉴하트; 2007–2008)
 Who Are You? (누구세요?; 2008)
  (우리들의 해피엔딩; 2008)
 Spotlight (스포트라이트; 2008)
  (대한민국 변호사; 2008)
 Beethoven Virus (베토벤 바이러스; 2008)
  (종합병원 2; 2008–2009)
 The Return of Iljimae (돌아온 일지매; 2009)
 Cinderella Man (신데렐라 맨; 2009)
 Triple (트리플; 2009)
 Soul (혼; 2009)
 Heading to the Ground (맨땅에 헤딩; 2009)
 Hero (히어로; 2009–2010)
 The Woman Who Still Wants to Marry (아직도 결혼하고 싶은 여자; 2010)
 Personal Taste (개인의 취향; 2010)
  (나는 별일없이 산다; 2010)
  (런닝, 구; 2010)
 Road No. 1 (로드 넘버원; 2010)
 Playful Kiss (장난스런 키스; 2010)
 Home Sweet Home (즐거운 나의 집; 2010)
 My Princess (마이 프린세스; 2011)
 Royal Family (로열 패밀리; 2011)
 The Greatest Love (최고의 사랑; 2011)
 Heartstrings (넌 내게 반했어; 2011)
 Can't Lose (지고는 못살아; 2011)
 Me Too, Flower! (나도 꽃; 2011)
 Moon Embracing the Sun (해를 품은 달; 2012)
 The King 2 Hearts (더킹 투하츠; 2012)
 I Do, I Do (아이두 아이두; 2012)
 Arang and the Magistrate (아랑사또전; 2012)
 Missing You (보고싶다; 2012–2013)
 7th Grade Civil Servant (7급 공무원; 2013)
 When a Man Falls in Love (남자가 사랑할 때; 2013)
 The Queen's Classroom (여왕의 교실; 2013)
 Two Weeks (투윅스; 2013)
 Medical Top Team (메디컬탑팀; 2013)
 Miss Korea (미스코리아; 2013–2014)
 Cunning Single Lady (앙큼한 돌싱녀; 2014)
 A New Leaf (개과천선; 2014)
 Fated to Love You (운명처럼 널 사랑해; 2014)
 My Spring Days (내 생애 봄날; 2014)
 Kill Me, Heal Me (킬미,힐미; 2015)
 Scholar Who Walks The Night (밤을 걷는 선비; 2015)
 Goodbye Mr. Black (굿바이 미스터 블랙; 2016)
 I'm Not a Robot (로봇이 아니야; 2017–2018)
 Hold Me Tight (손 꼭 잡고, 지는 석양을 바라보자; 2018)
 My Secret Terrius (내 뒤에 테리우스; 2018)

Wednesday–Thursday (22:00)

 Mr. Back (미스터 백; 2014)
 Angry Mom (앵그리맘; 2015)
 Warm and Cozy (맨도롱 또똣; 2015)
 She Was Pretty (그녀는 예뻤다; 2015)
 Sweet, Savage Family (달콤살벌 패밀리; 2015–2016)
 One More Happy Ending (한번 더 해피엔딩; 2016)
 Lucky Romance (운빨로맨스; 2016)
 W (더블유; 2016)
 Shopaholic Louis (쇼핑왕 루이; 2016)
 Weightlifting Fairy Kim Bok-joo (역도요정 김복주; 2016–2017)
 Missing 9 (미씽나인; 2017) 
 Radiant Office (자체발광 오피스; 2017)
 The Emperor: Owner of the Mask (군주-가면의 주인; 2017)
 Man Who Dies to Live (죽어야 사는 남자; 2017)
 Hospital Ship (병원선; 2017)
 Come and Hug Me (이리와 안아줘; 2018)
 The Time (시간; 2018)
 Children of Nobody (붉은 달 푸른 해; 2018–2019)
 Spring Turns to Spring (봄이 오나 봄; 2019)
 The Banker (더 뱅커; 2019)

Friday–Saturday

Friday–Saturday (19:25)
 Wuri's Family (우리집;  November 9, 2001 – March 29, 2002)

Friday–Saturday (19:55)
 Friends (프렌즈; February 15–16, 2002)

Friday–Saturday (21:50)

 Tracer (트레이서; January 7 – March 25, 2022)
 Tomorrow (내일; April 1 – May 21, 2022)
 Doctor Lawyer (닥터 로이어; June 3 – July 23, 2022)
 Big Mouth (빅마우스; July 29 – September 17, 2022)
 Golden Spoon (금수저; September 23 – November 12, 2022)
 Fanletter Please (팬레터를 보내주세요; November 18–26, 2022)
 The Forbidden Marriage (금혼령, 조선 혼인 금지령; December 9, 2022 – January 21, 2023)
 Kokdu: Season of Deity (꼭두의 계절; January 27, 2023 – present)
 Joseon Lawyer (조선변호사; March 2023)

Friday–Saturday (21:55)
 Star's Echo (별의 소리; January 30, 2004)

Friday–Saturday (22:00)
 The Veil (검은 태양; September 17 – October 23, 2021)
 The Red Sleeve (옷소매 붉은 끝동; November 12, 2021 – January 1, 2022)

Friday (22:10)
 SF8 (에스 에프 에잇; August 14 – October 9, 2020)

Saturday–Sunday

Saturday–Sunday (20:40)
 From Now On, Showtime! (지금부터 쇼타임!; April 23 – June 12, 2022)

Saturday night dramas
  (이벤트를 확인하세요; 2021)

Sunday morning dramas
For further details see Korean-language Wikipedia article: 문화방송 일요아침드라마.

  (한지붕 세가족; 1986–1994)
  (짝; 1994–1998)
  (사랑밖엔 난 몰라; 1998–2000)
 Say It with Your Eyes (눈으로 말해요; 2000–2001)
  (어쩌면 좋아; 2001–2002)
  (사랑을 예약하세요; 2002)
  (기쁜 소식; 2003)
 1% of Anything (1%의 어떤 것; 2003)
  (물꽃마을 사람들; 2004)
 Sweet Buns (단팥빵; 2004–2005)

Weekend soap operas
For further details see Korean-language Wikipedia article: 문화방송 주말연속극.

 Mom and Sister (엄마야 누나야; 2000–2001)
 Beating Heart (떨리는 가슴; 2005)
  (사랑찬가; 2005)
  (결혼합시다; 2005–2006)
 Love Truly (진짜진짜 좋아해; 2006)
 My Beloved Sister (누나; 2006–2007)
  (문희; 2007)
 Kimcheed Radish Cubes (깍두기; 2007–2008)
 Woman of Matchless Beauty, Park Jung-geum (천하일색 박정금; 2008)
  (내 인생의 황금기; 2008–2009)
 Good Job, Good Job (잘했군 잘했어; 2009)
 Tamra, the Island (탐나는 도다; 2009)
 Creating Destiny (인연 만들기; 2009–2010)
 Dandelion Family (민들레 가족; 2010)
 Gloria (글로리아; 2010–2011)
 Twinkle Twinkle (반짝반짝 빛나는; 2011)
 A Thousand Kisses (천번의 입맞춤; 2011–2012)
 God of War (무신; 2012)
  (아들 녀석들; 2012–2013)
 Pots of Gold (금 나와라, 뚝딱!; 2013)
 Give Love Away (사랑해서 남주나; 2013–2014)
 Jang Bo-ri is Here! (왔다! 장보리; 2014)
 Rosy Lovers (장미빛 연인들; 2014–2015)
 Make a Woman Cry (여자를 울려; 2015)
  (엄마; 2015–2016)
 Happy Home (가화만사성; 2016)
 Blow Breeze (불어라 미풍아; 2016–2017)
 You Are Too Much (당신은 너무합니다; 2017)
 Man in the Kitchen (밥상 차리는 남자; 2017–2018)
 The Rich Son (부잣집 아들; 2018)
 My Healing Love (내사랑 치유기; 2018–2019)

Weekend special project dramas
For further details see Korean-language Wikipedia article: 문화방송 주말 특별기획 드라마.

 5th Republic (제5공화국; 2005)
 Shin Don (신돈; 2005–2006)
 Fireworks (불꽃놀이; 2006)
  (도로시를 찾아라; 2006)
 Couple or Trouble (환상의 커플; 2006)
 White Tower (하얀 거탑; 2007)
 Que Sera, Sera (케세라, 세라; 2007)
 Air City (에어시티; 2007)
 Two Outs in the Ninth Inning (9회말 2아웃; 2007)
 The Last Scandal of My Life (마지막 스캔들; 2008)
 La Dolce Vita (달콤한 인생; 2008)
 Friend, Our Legend (친구, 우리들의 전설; 2009)
 Assorted Gems (보석비빔밥; 2009–2010)
 A Man Called God (신이라 불리운 사나이; 2010)
 Kim Su-ro, The Iron King (김수로; 2010)
 Flames of Desire (욕망의 불꽃; 2010–2011)
 Can You Hear My Heart (내 마음이 들리니; 2011)
 Hooray for Love (애정만만세; 2011–2012)
 Feast of the Gods (신들의 만찬; 2012)
 Dr. Jin (닥터 진; 2012)
 May Queen (메이퀸; 2012)
 A Hundred Year Legacy (백년의 유산; 2013)
 Scandal: A Shocking and Wrongful Incident (스캔들: 매우 충격적이고 부도덕한 사건; 2013)
 Golden Rainbow (황금 무지개; 2013–2014)
 Hotel King (호텔킹; 2014)
 Mama (마마 – 세상 무서울 게 없는; 2014)
 Legendary Witches (전설의 마녀; 2014)
 Queen's Flower (여왕의 꽃; 2015)
 My Daughter, Geum Sa-wol (내 딸, 금사월; 2015–2016)
 Marriage Contract (결혼계약; 2016)
 The Flower in Prison (옥중화; 2016)
 Father, I'll Take Care of You (아버님 제가 모실게요; 2016–2017)
 Bad Thief, Good Thief (도둑놈, 도둑님; 2017)
 Money Flower (돈꽃; 2017–2018)
 My Contracted Husband, Mr. Oh (데릴남편 오작두; 2018)
 Goodbye to Goodbye (이별이 떠났다; 2018)
 Hide and Seek (숨바꼭질; 2018)
 A Pledge to God (신과의 약속; 2018–2019)
 Love in Sadness (슬플 때 사랑한다; 2019)
 Different Dreams (이몽; 2019)
 The Golden Garden (황금정원; 2019)
 Never Twice (두 번은 없다, 2019–2020)

Daily dramas

Morning soap opera

Monday–Friday (07:50)

 End of Love (이제 사랑은 끝났다; 2006)
 Love Me When You Can (있을때 잘해!!; 2006–2007)
 By My Side (내 곁에 있어!; 2007)
 Even So Love (그래도 좋아!; 2007–2008)
 Don't Go Away (흔들리지마; 2008)
 White Lies (하얀 거짓말; 2008–2009)
 I Can't Stop (멈출 수 없어; 2009–2010)
 Pink Lipstick (분홍 립스틱; 2010)
 The Scarlet Letter (주홍글씨; 2010–2011)
 You're So Pretty (당신 참 예쁘다; 2011)
 Dangerous Women (위험한 여자; 2011–2012)
 An Angel's Choice (천사의 선택; 2012)
 It Was Love (사랑했나봐; 2012–2013)
 Good For You (잘났어 정말; 2013)
 Hold My Hand (내 손을 잡아; 2013–2014)
 Everybody, Kimchi! (모두 다 김치; 2014)
 Stormy Woman (폭풍의 여자; 2014–2015)
 Love of Eve (이브의 사랑; 2015)
 Victory For Tomorrow (내일도 승리; 2015–2016)
 Good Person (좋은 사람; 2016)
 Always Spring (언제나 봄날; 2016–2017)
 Teacher Oh Soon-nam (훈장 오순남; 2017)
 Reverse (역류; 2017–2018)
 Everybody Say Kungdari (모두 다 쿵따리; 2019)
 Bad Love (나쁜 사랑; 2019–2020)
 My Wonderful Life (찬란한 내 인생; 2020–2021)
 A Good Supper (밥이 되어라; 2021)

Monday–Saturday (09:00)
 Sisters of the Sea (자매바다; 2005–2006)
 End of Love (이제 사랑은 끝났다; 2006) (changed timeslot to 07:50 on 1 May 2006)

Historical soap opera
 Hur Jun, The Original Story (구암 허준; 2013)
 The King's Daughter, Soo Baek-hyang (제왕의 딸, 수백향; 2013–2014)

Daily night dramas

Monday–Friday (19:15)

 Can't Live Without You (그대없인 못살아; 2012)
 Here Comes Mr. Oh (오자룡이 간다; 2012–2013)
 Princess Aurora (오로라 공주; 2013)
 Shining Romance (빛나는 로맨스; 2013–2014)
 Make a Wish (소원을 말해봐; 2014)
 The Invincible Lady Cha (불굴의 차여사; 2014–2015)
 The Great Wives (위대한 조강지처; 2015)
 Dearest Lady (최고의 연인;  2015–2016)
 Begin Again (다시 시작해; 2016)
 Happiness Giver (행복을 주는 사람; 2016–2017)
 The Return of Fortunate Bok (돌아온 복단지; 2017)
 Enemies from the Past (전생에 웬수들; 2017–2018)
 Secrets and Lies (비밀과 거짓말 2018–2019)
 Blessing of the Sea (용왕님 보우하사; 2019)
 A Good Supper (밥이 되어라; 2021)
 Second Husband (두 번째 남편; 2021–2022)
 Game of Witches (마녀의 게임; 2022)

Monday–Friday (19:45)
  (얼마나 좋길래; 2006)
 Bad Woman, Good Woman (나쁜 여자 착한 여자; 2007)
 Opposites Attract (아현동 마님; 2007–2008)

Monday–Friday (20:15)

 Chunja's Happy Events (춘자네 경사났네; 2008)
 I Love You, Don't Cry (사랑해, 울지마; 2008–2009)
 What's for Dinner? (밥 줘; 2009)
 Enjoy Life (살맛 납니다; 2009–2010)
 Golden Fish (황금물고기; 2010)
 Stormy Lovers (폭풍의 연인; 2010–2011)
 I Trusted Him (남자를 믿었네; 2011)
 The Invincible Daughters-in-Law (불굴의 며느리; 2011)
 The Best Day in My Life (오늘만 같아라; 2011–2012)
 Can't Live Without You (그대없인 못살아; 2012) (changed timeslot to Monday to Friday 19:15 on 5 November 2012)

Monday–Friday (20:50)

 See and See Again (보고 또 보고; 1998–1999)
 Days of Delight (날마다 행복해; 1999–2000)
 Because of You (당신 때문에; 2000)
 Foolish Princes (온달왕자들; 2000–2001)
 Law of Marriage (결혼의 법칙; 2001)
 Every Day with You (매일 그대와; 2001–2002)
 Miss Mermaid (인어 아가씨; 2002–2003)
 Swan Lake (백조의 호수; 2003)
 Pretty Woman (귀여운 여인; 2003–2004)
 Lotus Flower Fairy (왕꽃 선녀님; 2004–2005)
 Be Strong, Geum-soon! (굳세어라 금순아; 2005)
 The Youth in Bare Feet (맨발의 청춘; 2005–2006)
 Love Can't Wait (사랑은 아무도 못말려; 2006)
 So in Love (얼마나 좋길래; 2006) (changed timeslot to Monday to Friday 19:45 on 6 November 2006)

Sitcoms

Monday–Friday (19:45)

 Nonstop (논스톱; 2000–2005)
 Elephant (코끼리; 2008)
 The Secret of Coocoo Island (크크섬의 비밀; 2008)
 Here He Comes (그분이 오신다; 2008–2009)
 Hilarious Housewives (태희 혜교 지현이; 2009)
 High Kick Through the Roof (지붕뚫고 하이킥; 2009–2010)
 Cutie Pie (볼수록 애교만점; 2010)
 All My Love (몽땅내사랑; 2010–2011)
 High Kick: Revenge of the Short Legged (하이킥! : 짧은 다리의 역습; 2011–2012)
 Standby (스탠바이; 2012)
 Mom is Acting Up (엄마가 뭐길래; 2012) (changed timeslot to Monday to Tuesday 8:50 PM on 5 November 2012)

Monday–Friday (20:20)
 High Kick! (거침없이 하이킥; 2006–2007)
 Kimchi Cheese Smile (김치 치즈 스마일; 2007–2008)
 Elephant (코끼리; 2008) (changed timeslot to 19:45 on 19 May 2008)

Special project dramas

 Mother's Garden (엄마의 정원; 2014)
 Apgujeong Midnight Sun (압구정 백야; 2014–2015)
 A Daughter Just Like You (딱 너 같은 딸; 2015)
 Beautiful You (아름다운 당신; 2015–2016)
 Working Mom Parenting Daddy (워킹 맘 육아 대디; 2016)
 Golden Pouch (황금주머니; 2016–2017)
 Sisters-in-Law (별별 며느리; 2017)

Drama specials
 Jikji (2005)
 Splash Splash Love (2015)

Sitcom
For further details see Korean-language Wikipedia article: 문화방송 시트콤.
 Hello Franceska (안녕, 프란체스카; 2005–2006)

News
 MBC News Today (MBC 뉴스투데이, breakfast newscast)
 930 MBC News (930 MBC 뉴스, brunch newscast)
 12 MBC News (12 MBC 뉴스, midday newscast)
 News Exhibit (2시 뉴스 외전, news and talk show program)
 5 MBC News (5 MBC 뉴스, afternoon newscast)
 MBC Newsdesk (MBC 뉴스데스크, main evening and flagship newscast since 1970)

Current affairs
 MBC 100 Minute Debate (MBC 100분 토론) (multiple-party debate programme)
 News Magazine 2580 (시사매거진 2580)
 PD Note
 News 'WHO'? (2006–)
 MBC Human Theatre (with SS501's Park Jung-min)
 The Real Story Eye (리얼스토리눈) (2014–)

Variety shows

 Sunday Night (일밤; 1981–present)
 King of Mask Singer (미스터리 음악쇼 복면가왕; 2015–present)
 Animals (애니멀즈; 2015)
 Dad! Where Are We Going? (아빠! 어디가?; 2013–2015)
 Dunia: Into a New World (두니아 – 처음 만난 세계; 2018)
 Wizard of Nowhere (오지의 마법사; 2017–2018)
 Secretly Greatly (은밀하게 위대하게; 2016–2017)
 Real Men (진짜 사나이; 2013–2016)
 Infinite Challenge (무한도전; 2005–2018)
 Show! Music Core (쇼! 음악중심; 2005–present)
 Golden Fishery (황금어장; 2006–present)
 Radio Star (라디오스타; 2007–present)
 We Got Married (우리 결혼했어요; 2008–2017)
 Girls' Generation's Horror Movie Factory (소녀시대의 공포영화 제작소; 2009)
 Girls' Generation's Cheer Up! (소녀시대의 힘내라 힘!; 2009)
 Idol Star Athletics Championships (아이돌스타 육상 선수권 대회; 2010–present) 
 I Am a Singer (나는 가수다); 2011–2015)
 Weekly Idol (주간 아이돌; 2011–present) 
 I Live Alone (나 혼자 산다; 2013–present)
 Dance Battle Korea
 Idol Dance D-Style
 KPop Generation
 Ranking Chart 8
 OST KING
 Live sound landscape picnic
 K-POP Super Collection
 Super Idol
 Duet Song Festival (듀엣가요제; 2016–2017)
 Thinking About My Bias (오빠생각; 2017)
 Omniscient Interfering View (전지적 참견 시점; 2018–present)
 Unexpected Q (뜻밖의 Q; 2018)
 Those Who Cross the Line (선을 넘는 녀석들; 2018–2020)
 Under Nineteen (언더나인틴; 2018–2019)
  (호구의연애; 2019)
 Hangout with Yoo (놀면 뭐하니? 2019–present)
  (백파더: 요리를 멈추지 마!; 2020–present)
 Crazy Recipe Adventure (볼빨간 신선놀음; 2021–present)
 Extreme Debut Wild Idol (극한데뷔 야생돌; 2021)
 My Teenage Girl (방과 후 설렘; 2021)
 Fantasy Boys (소년판타지; 2023)

Children's programs
 Chu Chu Chu (the longest-running children's programme in South Korea; 1981–2013, 2017–present)
 Animaniacs (2000–2004)
 Pucca (2007–2008, 2018–2019)
 Nalong (2004–2006)
 Nalong 2 (2006–2007)

Specials
 Girls' Generation's Christmas Fairy Tale (2011)
 Girls' Generation's Romantic Fantasy (2013)

See also
 List of programs broadcast by Arirang TV
 List of programmes broadcast by Korean Broadcasting System
 List of programs broadcast by Seoul Broadcasting System
 List of programs broadcast by tvN
 List of programs broadcast by JTBC

References

External links
 http://www.imbc.com 

MBC
Munhwa Broadcasting Corporation